The Russian Triathlon Federation (Федерация триатлона России) is the official national governing body for the sports of triathlon, duathlon and winter triathlon and represents Russia in World Triathlon.

After the 2022 Russian invasion of Ukraine, World Triathlon banned Russian and Belarusian athletes and officials in all of its international competitions and official events. Europe Triathlon said that it strongly supported the decision of the International Olympic Committee and World Triathlon to exclude Russian and Belarusian athletes and officials from organised European events, and to not organise international events in Russia or Belarus.

Structure 
In 2000, Bystrov was the vice coordinator of Vladimir Putin's  election campaign in Tver Oblast, from 2001 to 2004 he was Vice Minister of Labour and Social Development, from 2004 on he has worked in various functions in the Ministry of Transport and has been in charge of the infrastructure and logistics department for the Olympic Games in Sochi. 

World Championships (Elite)

Olympic Games
Igor Sysoyev took part in two Olympic Games. His wife Irina Abysova was a contender as well in one Olympics, but did not finish.

Trivia 
The RTF was one of the influential federations, as some incidents suggest:

Inna Tsyganok, a Ukrainian born Russian triathlete, was allowed to take part in various ITU competitions «representing ITU» because, when moving to Russia, she obviously did not fulfil the nationality criteria for about half a year and should not have been allowed to participate in any ITU events. The ITU did not answer to questions as to why Tsyganok «represented ITU» without a nationality. She has officially represented Russia since 2011.
Anastasiya Gorbunova, a clear DNS case at the Junior European Cup triathlon in Tabor (31 July 2011), was eliminated not only in the ITU result list, but also in the ITU start lists immediately after the triathlon in order to prevent her from being cancelled in the start list of the European Youth Championships in Lausanne. According to the Continental Cup rules, a triathlete who withdraws too late must be removed from all start lists for the next 30 days, hence Gorbunova, the best Russian female junior triathlete, should have been banned from the Youth Triathlon European Championships in Lausanne (27 August 2011). Gorbunova was present in full armour at the check in and the line up but did not go to the pontoon when her start number (83) was called. The ITU does not answer to inquiries as to why Gorbunova was eliminated after the race even in the ITU start list.
Surprisingly, a local Russian Cup triathlon in Penza was upgraded to a European Cup (3 July 2011) and Junior European Cup (2 July 2011) triathlon although the official ETU calendar did not include any ETU competitions in Russia. All international competitors being absent from this local event, the Russian participants could easily gain points in the ETU and ITU rankings.
National female triathlon team (with Irina Abysova among other athletes) was sponsored for two seasons (2012–13, 2013–14) by Russian businessman and Ironman triathlete Alexey Cheskidov. In 2014 Cheskidov founded the first series of triathlon and marathon events in Bronnitsy, Moscow Region. The series was called Titan with its logo and concept being highly influenced (or inspired) by non-present in Russia Ironman Triathlon and World Triathlon Corporation.

References

External links
 Russian Triathlon Federation

National members of the European Triathlon Union
Triathlon